Quvondiq Uktam oʻgʻli Roʻziyev (born 6 October 1994), better known as Kuvondik Ruziev, is an Uzbekistani footballer who plays as a midfielder for Navbahor Namangan and the Uzbekistan national football team.

International career
Ruziev made his professional debut for the Uzbekistan national football team in a friendly 2-0 loss to Turkey on 2 June 2019.

References

External links

1994 births
Living people
People from Surxondaryo Region
Uzbekistani footballers
Uzbekistan international footballers
Association football midfielders
Uzbekistan Super League players
PFC Lokomotiv Tashkent players